Mikhnevo is an urban locality (an urban-type settlement) in Stupinsky District of Moscow Oblast, Russia. Population:

References

Urban-type settlements in Moscow Oblast
Populated places in Stupinsky District